Ende (or En) is the first Spanish female manuscript illuminator to have her work documented through inscription: ENDE PINTRIX ET D(E)I AIUTRIX in the colophon of the Gerona Beatus. Most information about her comes down to the inscription in her artwork as there was no other record. Her lifetime is not known but can be assumed based on the inscription era in the Gerona Beatus: AD 975. The appellation of “dei aiutrix” alludes to the fact that she was probably a nun however it has been found what her foundation was. There are a number of hands discernible in the manuscripts. The chief scribe was a priest called Senior. Historians have also attributed elements of the manuscripts to Emetrius, whose style is attributable in comparison to an earlier signed work. However, based on painting style attributes, some theorists conclude that nearly all of the manuscript illustrations were completed by Ende.

Gerona Beatus 
Ende worked on a 10th-century group of manuscripts, of which there are 26 known copies with illustrations, however only Beatus of Girona contains the work of a woman.  These manuscripts contain the Commentary on the Apocalypse compiled by the Spanish monk Beatus of Liébana in 786.  The manuscripts were created in the monastery of Tabara in the mountains of Leon in northwest Spain.  

The illuminations illustrate the Apocalyptic Vision of St. John the Divine in the Book of Revelation in the Mozarabic style.  This style developed in Spain after the Muslim invasions, blending elements of Islamic art and decorative traditions, particularly the emphasis on geometry, rich colors, ornamented grounds, and stylized figures.

Ende was commissioned by Abbot Dominicus and finished the manuscript on July 6th in the year 975. It was assumed that she was at the monastery in Tabara when she finished. She also worked on the Gerona Beatus with Emeterius, brother and priest. 

There is debate over whether Ende did most of the work or if she was there to help Emeterius with what was considered “womanly” skills, such as decoration and delicate images. Emeterius had been known for working on previous versions of the Gerona Beatus. However, the consistent use of her artistic techniques shows that she played a big role in the creation of Gerona Beatus.

However, one is able to see the pattern of Ende’s work in Gerona Beatus because of her use of stratified backgrounds. This is the technique seen in art where the image is split into three areas. Ende split the background into heaven, a horizon of the human world, and the ground level of the world. She used many colors, such as yellow, dark blue, and orange.

References

Further reading

Chadwick, Whitney, Women, Art, and Society, Thames and Hudson, London, 1990
Harris, Anne Sutherland and Linda Nochlin, Women Artists: 1550-1950, Los Angeles County Museum of Art, Knopf, New York, 1976

Manuscript illuminators
Spanish women artists
10th-century artists
Year of birth unknown
Year of death unknown
10th-century Spanish artists
10th-century Spanish women
Medieval women artists
10th-century people from the Kingdom of León
Medieval Spanish women artists